Major General Paul Louis Wakefield was a journalist, politician, and soldier.

Early life 
Wakefield was born, raised, and attended school in Lovelady, Texas.  After graduation, he attended the University of Texas at Austin, where he majored in journalism.

Military career 
He served in the United States Army during World War I.  Later, he was appointed 1st Lieutenant in the Texas National Guard, where he eventually became a Major General.  In 1949, he was the director of the Selective Service in the state of Texas in 1949 before retiring in 1955.

Journalism career 
As soon as WWI was over, he worked as a newspaper reporter for the Houston Chronicle and later, the Texas reporter for the New York Herald Tribune.  He also worked for the New York World.

Political career 
Wakefield served as aides to 2 Texas Governors, a Vice President, and assistant to Jesse H. Jones.  He also worked served as a member of the planning board for the Public Works Administration.

Personal life and death 
Wakefield was married twice, the first ending in divorce.  He had one son.  He died in Austin in 1961.

References 

People from Houston County, Texas
World War I
Houston Chronicle people
Texas National Guard personnel
New York Herald Tribune people
United Press International people
Franklin D. Roosevelt administration personnel
New York World journalists
1895 births
1961 deaths
University of Texas at Austin alumni